Texas's 23rd congressional district stretches across the southwestern portion of Texas. It is a majority Hispanic district and has been represented by Republican Tony Gonzales since 2021.

Geography 
The 23rd district runs along the majority of Texas' border with Mexico, north of the Rio Grande. It stretches from western San Antonio to El Paso, encompassing numerous county seats and towns of regional economic importance.  

The district is predominantly rural. Campaigning is difficult due to its size and disparate influences; the population density is one of the lowest of any congressional district. 

Economic activities include farming, ranching, oil, and mineral extraction; also recreation, manufacturing, and tourism, as it encompasses all of Big Bend National Park and Big Bend Ranch State Park.

Demographics
According to the APM Research Lab's Voter Profile Tools (featuring the U.S. Census Bureau's 2019 American Community Survey), the district contained about 511,000 potential voters (citizens, age 18+). Of these, 64% are Latino, while 29% are White. One in ten potential voters were born outside of the U.S., now naturalized citizens. Median income among households (with one or more potential voter) in the district is about $61,800, while 11% of households live below the poverty line. As for the educational attainment of potential voters in the district, 17% of those 25 and older have not earned a high school degree, while 23% hold a bachelor's or higher degree.

Election results

Elections from 1967 to 1992
This district was created in 1967, following passage of the Voting Rights Act of 1965. In addition, it followed the case of Wesberry v. Sanders, resulting in Texas's previous congressional map being tossed out. Democrats held the district until 1993.

Elections from 1992 to 2002
Following the 1990 census, in 1992, the Texas Legislature created the new , mostly from the eastern portion of the 23rd. In the process, the legislature left a heavily Republican section of western San Antonio in the 23rd. Republican Henry Bonilla beat 4-term incumbent Albert Bustamante to take the seat in 1992.

Although the 23rd leaned slightly Democratic on paper, Bonilla had a very conservative voting record. Largely because of his popularity in San Antonio, he did not face a credible challenger until 2002, when the former Democratic Texas Secretary of State, Henry Cuellar, came within 2 points of unseating him.

2004 election
Several heavily Republican suburbs in the Texas Hill Country north of San Antonio were shifted into the 23rd district, all but ensuring Bonilla of a seventh term.

2006 election
Following the U.S. Supreme Court ruling in League of United Latin American Citizens v. Perry which found that the 23rd district violated the Voting Rights Act of 1965, the district was redrawn.

2010 election
The National Republican Congressional Committee targeted Texas's 23rd congressional district to try to regain it, and strongly supported the Republican campaign financially.

2012 election

2014 election

2016 election

2018 election

2020 election

2022 election

List of members representing the district

See also
List of United States congressional districts

References

Further reading

External links
"Court nixes part of Texas political map"
"Texas redistricting United States Congress"

23
Laredo, Texas